The 2018–19 EuroCup Women was the seventeenth edition of FIBA Europe's second-tier international competition for women's basketball clubs under such name.

Teams
Teams were confirmed by FIBA Europe on 29 June 2018.

Schedule

Qualification round

Conference 1

|}

Conference 2

|}

Group stage
Draw for the group stage was made on 5 July 2018 in Munich, Germany.

Conference 1

Group A

Group B

Group C

Group D

Group E

Conference 2

Group F

Group G

Group H

Group I

Group J

Ranking of third-placed teams

Conference 1

Conference 2

Seeding

Play-offs

Bracket

Final

See also
 2018–19 EuroLeague Women

References

External links
 EuroCup Women website

EuroCup Women seasons
2018–19 in European women's basketball leagues